Occupation of Seoul may refer to:

The 1894 Japanese Occupation of Gyeongbokgung Palace, part of the First Sino-Japanese War
The North Korean occupation of South Korea, June to September, 1950, part of the Korean War
Korea under Japanese rule, from 1910 to 1945
United States Army Military Government in Korea, from 1945 to 1948

See also
History of Seoul